Follonica Hockey or Associazione Sportiva Dilettantistica Follonica Hockey is a roller hockey team from Follonica, Italy. It was established in 1952.

History
Merged in 1962 with another team belonging to the same town, Follonica Hockey made their debut in the Serie A italian championship in 1962. After alternating during several seasons the first and second tiers, in the 1970s the club consolidates in the top league and wins their first national cup in 1977 and five years later the second one.

In 2005, Follonica wins their first continental title by winning the 2004–05 CERS Cup and weeks later, they would achieve the first of their four consecutive Italian leagues.

One year later, Follonica became the first Italian team to win the CERH European League, the top European club competition.

Honours

National
Serie A1 italian championship: 4
 2005, 2006, 2007, 2008
Coppa Italia: 9
 1977, 1982, 2005, 2006, 2007, 2008, 2009, 2010, 2018
Coppa di Lega: 1
 1985
Supercoppa Italiana: 3
 2005, 2006, 2008

International
Intercontinental Cup: 1
2007
European League: 1
2006
CERS Cup: 1
2005

External links
Official Website.

Roller hockey clubs in Italy
Sports clubs established in 1952
Follonica